The Taranaki by-election of 1918 was a by-election in the  electorate on the west coast of the North Island. It was held during the 19th New Zealand Parliament, on 10 October 1918. It was caused by the death of incumbent MP Henry Okey of the Reform Party and was won by Sydney George Smith, the son of previous Taranaki MP Edward Smith, who stood as an independent Labour candidate. Smith supported the war effort unlike most Labour politicians, gaining him support of voters who likewise supported the war.

Result
The following table gives the election results:

Notes

References

Taran
1918 elections in New Zealand
Politics of Taranaki
October 1918 events